Lindesberg Municipality (Lindesbergs kommun) is a municipality in Örebro County in central Sweden. Its seat is located in the city of Lindesberg.

The present municipality was created in 1971 when the former City of Lindesberg and the former market town of Frövi were joined together.

Localities
By size, as of 2000:
Lindesberg (seat)
Frövi
Storå
Fellingsbro
Vedevåg
Stråssa
Gusselby
Ramsberg
Rockhammar
Fryggesboda

Riksdag elections

Demographics

2022
This is a demographic table based on Lindesberg Municipality's electoral districts in the 2022 Swedish general election sourced from SVT's election platform, in turn taken from SCB official statistics.

Residents include everyone registered as living in the district, regardless of age or citizenship status. Valid voters indicate Swedish citizens above the age of 18 who therefore can vote in general elections. Left vote and right vote indicate the result between the two major blocs in said district in the 2022 general election. Employment indicates the share of people between the ages of 20 and 64 who are working taxpayers. Foreign background denotes residents either born abroad or with two parents born outside of Sweden. Median income is the received monthly income through either employment, capital gains or social grants for the median adult above 20, also including pensioners in Swedish kronor. College graduates indicates any degree accumulated after high school.

In total there were 23,563 residents with 18,038 Swedish citizen adults eligible to vote. The political demographics were 44.5 % for the left bloc and 53.7 % for the right bloc. The northeastern part of Lindesberg has a majority of non-Swedish background. It also has the lowest median income and the lowest levels of employment, while the wealthiest district of Linde encircling the town has the highest share of Swedish background in the municipality. The town of Lindesberg leaned slightly to the left, whereas the countryside had very high shares for the right and in particular the Sweden Democrats.

Twin towns

Lindesberg's five twin towns with the year of its establishing:

(1940) Kuusankoski (Kouvola), Finland 
(?) Oppdal, Norway 
(?) Jammerbugt Municipality, Denmark 
(1990) Frunzensky District, Saint Petersburg, Russia 
(1995) Haßberge, Germany

Industry
The largest employer is the municipality. After that follow the large hospital, serving the northern parts of Örebro County. Larger companies include  Por Pac (Fagerdala Foams), Arvin Meritor and Liab.

References

External links

Lindesberg Municipality - Official site

Municipalities of Örebro County